Saltings is an electoral division of West Sussex in the United Kingdom, and returns one member to sit on West Sussex County Council.

Extent
It comprises the following Adur district wards: Marine Ward and Widewater Ward. The eastern half falls within the un-parished area of Shoreham-by-Sea, while the western half lies in the southern part of Lancing civil parish.

2013 Election
Results of the election held on 2 May 2013:

2009 Election
Results of the election held on 4 June 2009:

2005 Election
Results of the election held on 5 May 2005:

References
Election Results - West Sussex County Council

External links
 West Sussex County Council
 Election Maps

Electoral Divisions of West Sussex